Clumsy or clumsiness  may refer to:

Behaviour
Accident-proneness
Developmental coordination disorder, a motor skills disorder which brings about chronic clumsiness

Music
Clumsy (Our Lady Peace album), a 1997 album by Our Lady Peace
"Clumsy" (Our Lady Peace song), from the above album
Clumsy (Samiam album), a 1994 album by Samiam
"Clumsy" (Fergie song), from the album The Dutchess
"Clumsy" (Britney Spears song), from the album  Glory
"Clumsy", a song by All Time Low from the album Wake Up, Sunshine

Literature
A graphic novel by Jeffrey Brown

Software
"Clumsy" (Software), Software tool for network error simulation